Michael W. Ford (born July 4, 1976, in Indianapolis, Indiana) is an American occultist, author, and musician.
 He is the former co-president of the now closed Greater Church of Lucifer (GCOL) which was the first Luciferian building in the United States. It was located in Old Town Springs, Texas. More recently, he works with Jeremy Crow and Hope Marie Ford operating the Assembly of Light Bearers. Ford has self-published a number of books on the occult and recorded a number of albums as well. His magical name is Akhtya.

Luciferian work and books
Ford began to study and write about Lucifer. He self-published his first book in 1999. He generally works without an editor. To date, he has self-published over 20 books on the occult such as Bible of the Adversary, Luciferian Witchcraft, and Wisdom of Eosphoros. Luciferian Witchcraft was a top seller on Lulu.com. Regarding the content of his books, Ford presents both theistic and atheistic approaches to Luciferianism. His writings found in The Wisdom of Eosphoros (2015) were the basis of the Luciferian philosophy taught at the Greater Church of Lucifer.

Ford worked to open the Greater Church of Lucifer in Old Town Springs, Texas on Halloween 2015. There were a variety of responses from the Christian community. Many Christians came to protest the event. Protestors sprayed holy water on the church and surrounding buildings. Some people boycotted the town of Old Town Spring in response to the church. The church itself was vandalized. Its windows were smashed. Most notably, the branch of a 200-year-old pecan tree hanging over the church was sawed off in the middle of the night and damaged the roof. The Greater Church of Lucifer described this as an act of terrorism. Ford stated that The Greater Church of Lucifer was forced to shut down one year later because their landlord refused to renew their lease after receiving death threats.

Music
In 1993, Ford formed Black Funeral, a black metal band, in Indianapolis. He relocated to Houston, Texas to continue making black metal music.

Ford recorded with a number of other metal bands as well: Valefor, Sorath, Darkness Enshroud, Akhkharu, Ordo Tyrannis, Atra Mors, Hexentanz, and Psychonaut 75.

He also did guest work for several other bands such as Drowning the Light, Horda Profana, Profezia, Bitter Peace (band), and Corona Barathri.

References

External links
  Assembly of Light Bearers’ page
  Michael W. Ford’s page

Black metal musicians
Living people
1976 births
American occult writers
American occultists